"Electric Harley House (of Love)" is a single by American comedy metal/punk band Green Jellÿ.

Track listing versions

"Electric Harley House (of Love) (Rock Version)" - 4:38
"Electric Harley House (of Love) (Edit)" - 3:49

Lawsuit

In 1993, Green Jellÿ was sued by the management of Metallica for partial use of their song "Enter Sandman" in the song "Electric Harley House (of Love)".  The bass and rhythm guitars in the solo section of the song play a riff close to that of "Enter Sandman", and even though the band mentions it in lyric immediately after the riff, the band was forced to remove the part from the later CD versions of Cereal Killer and pull the music video from MTV.

Personnel
Danny Carey – drums
Bill Tutton, Rootin' Bloomquist – bass
Marc Levinthal, Steven Shenar, Bernie Peaks – guitar
Bill Manspeaker, Joe Cannizzaro, Gary Helsinger, Greg Raynard, and Maynard James Keenan – vocals
Kim O'Donnell and Caroline Jester – back-up vocals, floor tom drummers

1993 songs
American punk rock songs
Green Jellÿ songs
Songs involved in plagiarism controversies